Jackson is a prominent lunar impact crater that is located in the northern hemisphere on the far side of the Moon. Less than one crater to the northeast is the crater Mineur, and to the south-southwest lies McMath.

This crater created a large ray system. A skirt of higher-albedo material covers the surface within one crater diameter, with a slightly darker band along the outer ramparts. Beyond that radius, the rays form wide sections that grow increasingly diffuse and wispy with distance. The largest sections lie in roughly 90° arcs to the northeast and southwest, while a narrower arc projects to the south-southeast. The rays continue for hundreds of kilometers across the surface.

The rim of the crater is well-defined and not significantly worn. The edge is somewhat polygonal in shape, with the southeastern rim being more rounded. The inner walls display some terracing. The interior floor is generally level with some irregularities in the northeastern part. Parts of the floor have a relatively high albedo.

Jackson lies to the northwest of the Dirichlet-Jackson Basin.

Satellite craters
By convention these features are identified on lunar maps by placing the letter on the side of the crater midpoint that is closest to Jackson.

External links
Melt Fractures in Jackson Crater, Lunar Reconnaissance Orbiter Camera (LROC)
Jackson's Complexity, Lunar Reconnaissance Orbiter Camera (LROC)
Zowie! (Jackson's central peaks), Lunar Reconnaissance Orbiter Camera (LROC)

References

 
 
 
 
 
 
 
 
 
 
 
 

Impact craters on the Moon